The Minister for National Emergency Services was a ministry in the government of New South Wales during World War II, with the two principal activities being a) the provision of measures for the protection of the life and property of the people, such as provision of air raid warnings, lighting control, air raid shelters, protection of vital plant and numerous other schemes to meet emergency conditions; and b) operational activities, including the organisation of personnel trained in specialist duties to cope with the immediate effects of enemy attack. While the agency was created in 1939 and Michael Bruxner, the Deputy Premier and Minister for Transport, was the first responsible minister, it was not created as a formal portfolio until the first McKell ministry in 1941.

Role and responsibilities 
The National Emergency Services, New South Wales commenced operation on 1 February 1939. The agency was formed in response to a request from the Prime Minister that the Australian states devise a scheme for the protection of the civilian population against possible attacks from the air in the event of a national attack. Bruxner, the first minister, had been a member of the Australian Imperial Force in World War I and had finished that war promoted to lieutenant colonel.

The first task of the department was to prepare a scheme of organisation for the State. The scheme provided for the formation of a Civil Defence Organisation upon a municipal or shire basis. Each municipality or shire became an "Area". A Chief Warden was appointed, to take charge of each Area. The Chief Warden and all of the area staff served in a voluntary capacity.

The headquarters’ staff, under a director, who was responsible to the minister, were public sector employees. In addition to a secretary and clerical staff, officers included a controller of training, a supervisor of first aid training, liaison officers and an executive officer of the technical committee, who was an officer of the professional staff of the Department of Public Works. Arrangements were made for the establishment of a special control staff at headquarters to assist in the event of an attack. In order that the best technical advice should be available, committees directly responsible to the Director were appointed. The personnel of these committees were also volunteers.

The National Emergency Act 1941 received assent on 20 March 1941, and remained in force for the duration of hostilities with Germany and for a period of six months thereafter. The Act provided for preparing and implementing Raid Precautions Schemes and Regulations. The first Raid Precautions Scheme was gazetted on 6 June 1941, and the first Regulations on 13 June 1941. The legislation was amended in October 1941, to bring navigable waters under the scope of the Act.

List of ministers

References 

Housing
New South Wales